The 1980 Rutgers Scarlet Knights football team represented Rutgers University in the 1980 NCAA Division I-A football season. In their eighth season under head coach Frank R. Burns, the Scarlet Knights compiled a 7–4 record while competing as an independent and outscored their opponents 279 to 156. The team's statistical leaders included Ed McMichael with 1,761 passing yards, Albert Ray with 778 rushing yards, and Tim Odell with 718 receiving yards.

Schedule

Roster

References

Rutgers
Rutgers Scarlet Knights football seasons
Rutgers Scarlet Knights football